The 1991 Tokyo Indoor, also known by its sponsored name Seiko Super Tennis, was a men's tennis tournament played on indoor carpet courts in Tokyo, Japan that was part of the IBM 1991 ATP Tour and was an ATP Championship Series event. It was the 14th edition of the tournament and was held from 8 October through 14 October 1991. Matches were the best of three sets. First-seeded Stefan Edberg won the singles title.

Finals

Singles

 Stefan Edberg defeated  Derrick Rostagno 6–3, 1–6, 6–2
 It was Edberg's 6th singles title of the year and the 33rd of his career.

Doubles

 Jim Grabb /  Richey Reneberg defeated  Scott Davis /  David Pate 7–5, 2–6, 7–6

References

External links
 ITF tournament edition detials

Tokyo Indoor
Tokyo Indoor
Tokyo Indoor
Tokyo Indoor